Ashok Madansingh Jagdale (20 November 1945 – 25 July 2022) was an Indian cricketer who played for Madhya Pradesh. He was a right-hand batsman who bowled right-arm medium-fast. He was the son of Madhavsinh Jagdale and elder brother of Sanjay Jagdale.

References

External links
 
 

1945 births
2022 deaths
Indian cricketers
Madhya Pradesh cricketers
Cricketers from Indore